George M.B. Maughs (1823–1895) was a physician who served a one-year term as Kansas City, Missouri mayor in 1860.

Biography
He was born in Loudoun County, Virginia and attended The College of William & Mary in Williamsburg.  He came to Kansas City around 1855 and opened a medical practice on Main Street between 2nd and 3rd.  He and T.S. Case published a short-lived medical journal The Kansas City Review of Medicine and Surgery.

Favoring the South in the American Civil War he was among the several residents who had to leave the city during General Order No. 11.  He did not return and died in Los Angeles, California.

References

People from Loudoun County, Virginia
1823 births
1895 deaths
Mayors of Kansas City, Missouri
College of William & Mary alumni
19th-century American politicians